Leonard Hugh Newman, (3 February 1909 - 23 January 1993) was a British entomologist, author and broadcaster.  He wrote many popular books on insects, especially butterflies and moths.  With Peter Scott and James Fisher, he was a resident member of the team who presented "Nature Parliament" on BBC radio's Children's Hour in the 1950s.  He ran a butterfly farm in Kent (which he inherited from his father), supplying among others Sir Winston Churchill, who bought many butterflies for his house at Chartwell.  A collection of Newman's entomological photographs is held by the library of the Natural History Museum in London

Bibliography (incomplete)
Talking of butterflies, moths and other fascinating insects (1946)
Butterfly haunts (1948)
British moths and their haunts (1949)
Butterflies on the wing (1949)
Moths on the wing (1950)
Stand & stare (1950) with W. J. C. Murray
Transformations of butterflies and moths (1952)
Nature parliament: A book of the broadcasts (1952) with James Fisher and Peter Scott
Linger and look (1952)
Nature's way : questions and answers on animal behaviour (1952) with W. J. C. Murray
How's your pet? (1953)
The observer's book of common British insects and spiders (1953)
Butterfly farmer (1953)
Butterflies of the fields and lanes, hills and heathland (1954)
Garden and woodland butterflies (1954)
Wander and watch (1954) with W. J. C. Murray
Butterflies of day and night : a book of beautiful butterflies and magnificent moths (1954)
Instructions to young naturalists (1956) with Maxwell Knight and W. E. Swinton
Looking at butterflies (1959)
Hawk-moths of Great Britain and Europe (1965)
Man and insects (1965)
Living with butterflies (1967)
Create a butterfly garden (1967), with Moira Savonius
Ants from close up (1968), with Stephen Dalton
The complete British butterflies in colour (1968)

British entomologists
British lepidopterists
1909 births
1993 deaths
20th-century American zoologists